“Google Female Rapper” is a single by American rapper Kellee Maize.  It debuted on YouTube on March 20, 2012.  It was filmed in downtown Pittsburgh and was shot in one continuous take.

Alex Dimarco directed the music video.  Kellee freestyles over Twista's 2004 hit single, ”Overnight Celebrity.” 
The video was filmed in March 2012 and shot at Market Square in Downtown Pittsburgh.

References

External links
 Google Female Wrapper on YouTube

2012 singles
2012 songs
Song recordings produced by Kanye West